Grupo Desportivo Igreja Nova, commonly known as Igreja Nova, is a Portuguese football club based in Igreja Nova, a parish in the municipality of Mafra. Founded in 1950, the club currently plays in the Terceira Divisão.

Football clubs in Portugal
Association football clubs established in 1950
1950 establishments in Portugal